Metacentric may refer to:

 Metacentric height, the distance between the center of gravity of a ship and its metacenter
 Metacentric centromere, the position of a centromere on a chromatid